Densify is a privately held software company based in Richmond Hill, Ontario, Canada. The company provides machine learning analytics services related to public cloud utilization and billing data to deliver the savings on corporate cloud bill.

History

Densify was co-founded by Andrew Hillier, Riyaz Somani and Jayanti Parmar in 1999. In 2005, Gerry Smith – who was previously executive vice president of IT Governance solutions at Compuware Corporation joined as the new CEO.  The company was formerly known as Cirba Inc. and changed its name to Densify, in June 2017.

Technology

Delivered as a service, Densify's patented optimization engine collects and analyzes data from cloud computing services and other IT environments, which is further combined with advisory services of cloud experts who report on cost, explore usage patterns, and project future trends.  Densify is compatible with Amazon Web Services, Microsoft Azure, Google Cloud Platform, and hybrid cloud environments.

Densify has also introduced a complimentary EC2 Assessment service to help AWS users identify risk reduction & cost saving opportunities.

Recognition

In April 2017, IDC recognized Densify as an innovator in multi-cloud management. In June 2017, EMA Research selected Densify as an EMA Top 3 product stating that "Densify delivers better application performance with the highest asset utilization and lowest cloud spend without requiring any special training". In September 2017, Densify was awarded Best of VMworld 2017 Gold Award and recognized as "the most impressive find" by Justin Warren, Forbes. In January  2018, Densify was rated 9.5/10 by ZDnet.com in its recent product review. In 2018 Densify was acknowledged as a "Leader" in The Forrester Wave report on Cloud Cost Monitoring and Optimization.

References

Software companies established in 1999
Canadian companies established in 1999
Software companies of Canada
Amazon Web Services
Cloud computing providers
Cloud infrastructure
Cloud platforms
Companies based in Markham, Ontario
1999 establishments in Ontario
Privately held companies of Canada